Karl Knabl (26 January 1850 – 15 June 1904) was a German landscape and genre painter.

Biography
He was born in Munich, the son of sculptor Joseph Knabl. He first practiced sculpture under his father's instruction, but became a genre painter as a pupil of Karl Theodor von Piloty. Of his genre paintings, his motifs usually involved the lower classes of society.

Paintings 
 , ("The robbed miser", 1874).
 Die Schusterwerkstatt, ("The cobbler's workshop", 1875).
 Die kleinen Zitherspieler ("The small zither player", 1878).
 An Undiscovered Genius (1879).
 Die Holzfahrt im bayrischen Hochgebirge ("The ride through the woods in the Bavarian mountains", 1883).
 Wilderer, ("Poachers", 1890).
 Auf der Alm, ("On the Alm", 1897).

References
 

1850 births
1904 deaths
19th-century German painters
19th-century German male artists
German male painters
20th-century German painters
20th-century German male artists
Artists from Munich